Pellam Oorelithe is 2003 Indian Telugu-language comedy film directed by S. V. Krishna Reddy starring Srikanth, Venu Thottempudi, Sangeeta, and Rakshita. The film is a remake of Tamil film Charlie Chaplin (2002).

Plot
Vivek (Srikanth) runs an advertisement agency. He is married to Sandhya (Sangeeta). Subbu (Venu Thottempudi) works as a photographer with Vivek. Vivek treats him as a brother. During a photo shoot, he happens to see Raaji (Rakshita) and falls in love with her. Samba (Sunil), a womanizer, sends a prostitute, Tilottama, to the guesthouse of Vivek when Sandhya prepares to visit her mother's house. When Tilottama arrives at Vivek's place, Sandhya suddenly comes back on some work and enquires Vivek who she is. In a hurry to cover up his act, Vivek lie to her that she is the wife of Subbu. This leads to so many problems for Vivek and Subbu. What happens when the wives come to know about their husbands' lies forms the climax.

Cast
 Srikanth as Vivek
 Venu Thottempudi as Subbu
 Sangeeta as Sandhya
 Rakshita as Raaji
 Sunil as Samba
 Jyothi as Tilottama
 Brahmanandam
Gundu Hanumantha Rao
Suman Setty
M.S. Narayana

Soundtrack
Music by Mani Sharma.
"O Mallepoovuraa" - Udit Narayan, Kalpana
"Milamila Merise" - S. P. Balasubrahmanyam, Gopika Poornima
"Jhoom Sharabi" - Chakri, Mallikarjun, Gopika Poornima, Preethi
"Ulakki Papa" - Karthik, Usha
"Dondapandulanti" - Hariharan,  Kalpana

Reception 
Idlebrain.com gave the film three-and-half stars out of five and stated that "This film is a clean comedy film from first frame to last frame."

Accolades 
Santosham Film Awards 2004
Best Entertainment Film

References

External links
 

2003 films
2000s Telugu-language films
Films directed by S. V. Krishna Reddy
Indian comedy films
Telugu remakes of Tamil films
Films scored by Mani Sharma
2003 comedy films